Killian Cronin (born October 1978) is an Irish hurler who played as a full-back for the Cork senior team.

Born in Cloyne, County Cork, Cronin first arrived on the inter-county scene at the age of twenty-five when he first linked up with the Cork senior team. Cronin was a member of the extended panel for a number of years and won one Munster medal as a non-playing substitute.

At club level Cronin plays with Cloyne.

Honours

Team

Cork
Munster Senior Hurling Championship (1): 2006 (sub)

References

1978 births
Living people
Cloyne hurlers
Cork inter-county hurlers
Hurling backs